Joan Webster Price (born 1931) is an American artist. Her work is included in the collections of the Whitney Museum of American Art, the Smithsonian American Art Museum and the Museum of Modern Art, New York.

References

1931 births
20th-century American women artists
Living people
Artists in the Smithsonian American Art Museum collection
21st-century American women